Lawrence Foanaota OBE, born on Malaita, is a Solomon Islander archaeologist. He has been director & curator of the Solomon Islands National Museum since 1972. He has also been President of the Pacific Island Museums Association.

In 2009, the Queen of the Solomon Islands, Elizabeth II, appointed him Officer of the Order of the British Empire, for "services to the National Museum and to the community".

References

Living people
Solomon Islands archaeologists
People from Malaita Province
Officers of the Order of the British Empire
Year of birth missing (living people)